The Kursk electoral district was a constituency created for the 1917 Russian Constituent Assembly election. The electoral district covered the Kursk Governorate.

Kursk was an agrarian, Black Earth province with no industries. The Bolshevik vote was largely attributed to soldiers returning home from the front. In Kursk town the Kadets got 10,043 votes (45.1%), the Bolsheviks 5,793 votes (26%), SRs 3,876 votes (17.4%), Popular Socialists 1,599 votes (7.2%), Mensheviks 688 votes (3.1%) and Landowners 257 votes (1.2%). 4,143 out of the 5,793 Bolshevik votes came from the town garrison, where the Bolsheviks obtained 58.2%. The second largest party in the Kursk garrison were the SRs (2,169 votes, 30.5%).

Results

References

Electoral districts of the Russian Constituent Assembly election, 1917